

441001–441100 

|-bgcolor=#f2f2f2
| colspan=4 align=center | 
|}

441101–441200 

|-bgcolor=#f2f2f2
| colspan=4 align=center | 
|}

441201–441300 

|-bgcolor=#f2f2f2
| colspan=4 align=center | 
|}

441301–441400 

|-bgcolor=#f2f2f2
| colspan=4 align=center | 
|}

441401–441500 

|-bgcolor=#f2f2f2
| colspan=4 align=center | 
|}

441501–441600 

|-id=563
| 441563 Domanski || 2008 UK || Juliusz Domanski (1931–2015) was an astronomy and physics popularizer in Poland. He was a long-term methodical adviser in the fields of physics and astronomy and encouraged many students. || 
|}

441601–441700 

|-bgcolor=#f2f2f2
| colspan=4 align=center | 
|}

441701–441800 

|-bgcolor=#f2f2f2
| colspan=4 align=center | 
|}

441801–441900 

|-bgcolor=#f2f2f2
| colspan=4 align=center | 
|}

441901–442000 

|-bgcolor=#f2f2f2
| colspan=4 align=center | 
|}

References 

441001-442000